Thornton and Allerton (population 18,000 - 2021 ward profile) is a ward within the City of Bradford Metropolitan District Council in the county of West Yorkshire, England, named after the villages of Thornton and Allerton around which it is drawn.

The population has increased considerably over the past 20 years, with an increase of nearly a fifth (3,000) from the 2001 UK census. The ward has also urbanised considerably, particularly in Allerton, which has contributed to a notable swing from Conservative to Labour in the last decade, and can be described as primarily suburban.

As well as the villages of Thornton and Allerton, the ward includes the smaller village of Sandy Lane, hamlets of Keelham and Little Egypt, and neighbourhoods of Stony Lane, Broom Hill, School Green and Leaventhorpe.

Councillors 
Thornton and Allerton ward is represented on Bradford Council by three Labour Party councillors, Karen Regan, Sue Duffy and Beverley Mullaney. The area has swung considerably from Conservative to Labour over the last 10 years, with all three Conservative councillors between 2014 and 2016 being replaced by Labour candidates, whose majorities all increased with swings of at least 5% in their subsequent re-elections.

 indicates seat up for re-election.

References 

Wards of Bradford